Włodzimierz Mejsak (born 7 March 1945) is a Polish diver. He competed in the men's 10 metre platform event at the 1968 Summer Olympics.

References

1945 births
Living people
Polish male divers
Olympic divers of Poland
Divers at the 1968 Summer Olympics
Divers from Warsaw